Timnit Gebru (born 1983/1984)  is an American computer scientist who works on algorithmic bias and data mining. She is an advocate for diversity in technology and co-founder of Black in AI, a community of Black researchers working in artificial intelligence (AI). She is the founder of the Distributed Artificial Intelligence Research Institute (DAIR).  

In December 2020, Gebru was the center of a public controversy stemming from her abrupt and contentious departure from Google as technical co-lead of the Ethical Artificial Intelligence Team. Higher management had requested she withdraw an as-yet-unpublished paper or remove the names of all Google coauthors, and said that the paper ignored recent research. She requested insight into the decision, and warned that non-compliance would result in her negotiating her departure. Google terminated her employment immediately, stating they were accepting her resignation.

Gebru has been recognized widely for her expertise in technology and artificial intelligence. She was named one of the World's 50 Greatest Leaders by Fortune and one of Nature's ten people who shaped science in 2021, and in 2022, one of Time's most influential people.

Early life and education 
Gebru was born and reared in Addis Ababa, Ethiopia. Her father, an electrical engineer with a Doctor of Philosophy (PhD), died when she was five years old, and she was reared by her mother, an economist. Both her parents are from Eritrea. When Gebru was 15, during the Eritrean–Ethiopian War, she fled Ethiopia after some of her family was deported to Eritrea and compelled to fight in the war. She was initially denied a US visa and briefly lived in Ireland, but she eventually received political asylum in the US, an experience she said was "miserable". Gebru settled in Somerville, Massachusetts to attend high school, where she says she immediately started to experience racially-based discrimination, with some teachers refusing to allow her to take certain Advanced Placement courses, despite being a high-achiever.

After completing high school, an encounter with the police set Gebru on a course toward a focus on ethics in technology. A friend of hers, a Black woman, was assaulted in a bar, and Gebru called the police to report it. She says that instead of filing the assault report, her friend was arrested and remanded to a cell. Gebru called it a pivotal moment and a "blatant example of systemic racism".

In 2001, Gebru was accepted at Stanford University. There she earned her Bachelor of Science and Master of Science degrees in electrical engineering and her PhD in computer vision in 2017. Gebru was advised during her PhD program by Fei-Fei Li.

During the 2008 United States presidential election, Gebru canvassed in support of Barack Obama.

Gebru presented her doctoral research at the 2017 LDV Capital Vision Summit competition, where computer vision scientists present their work to members of industry and venture capitalists. Gebru won the competition, starting a series of collaborations with other entrepreneurs and investors.

Both during her PhD program in 2016 and in 2018, Gebru returned to Ethiopia with Jelani Nelson's programming campaign AddisCoder.

While working on her PhD, Gebru authored a paper that was never published about her concern over the future of AI. She wrote of the dangers of the lack of diversity in the field, centered on her experiences with the police and on a ProPublica investigation into predictive policing, which revealed a projection of human biases in machine learning. In the paper, she scathed the "boy's club culture," reflecting on her experiences at conference gatherings of drunken male attendees sexually harassing her, and criticized the hero worship of the field's celebrities.

Career

2004–2013: Software development at Apple 
Gebru joined Apple as an intern while at Stanford, working in their hardware division making circuitry for audio components, and was offered a full-time position the following year. Of her work as an audio engineer, her manager told Wired she was "fearless," and well-liked by her colleagues. During her tenure at Apple, Gebru became more interested in building software, namely computer vision that could detect human figures. She went on to develop signal processing algorithms for the first iPad. At the time, she said she did not consider the potential use for surveillance, saying "I just found it technically interesting."

Long after leaving the company, during the #AppleToo movement in the summer of 2021, which was led by Apple engineer Cher Scarlett, who consulted with Gebru, Gebru revealed she experienced "so many egregious things" and "always wondered how they manage[d] to get out of the spotlight." She said that accountability at Apple was long overdue, and warned they could not continue to fly under the radar for much longer. Gebru also criticized the way the media covers Apple and other tech giants, saying that the press helps shield such companies from public scrutiny.

2013–2017: Research at Stanford and Microsoft 
In 2013, Gebru joined Fei-Fei Li's lab at Stanford. She used data mining of publicly available images. She was interested in the amount of money spent by governmental and non-governmental organisations trying to collect information about communities. To investigate alternatives, Gebru combined deep learning with Google Street View to estimate the demographics of United States neighbourhoods, showing that socioeconomic attributes such as voting patterns, income, race, and education can be inferred from observations of cars. If the number of pickup trucks outnumbers the number of sedans, the community is more likely to vote for the Republican party. They analysed over 15 million images from the 200 most populated US cities. The work was extensively covered in the media, being picked up by BBC News, Newsweek, The Economist, and The New York Times.

In 2015, Gebru attended the field's top conference, Neural Information Processing Systems (NIPS), in Montreal, Canada. Out of 3,700 attendees, she noted she was one of only a few Black researchers. When she attended again the following year, she kept a tally, and noted that there were only five Black men, and that she was the only Black woman out of 8,500 delegates. Together with her colleague Rediet Abebe, Gebru founded Black in AI, a community of Black researchers working in artificial intelligence.

In the summer of 2017, Gebru joined Microsoft as a postdoctoral researcher in the Fairness, Accountability, Transparency and Ethics in AI (FATE) lab. In 2017, Gebru spoke at the Fairness and Transparency conference, where MIT Technology Review interviewed her about biases that exist in AI systems and how adding diversity in AI teams can fix that issue. In her interview with Jackie Snow, Snow asked Gebru, "How does the lack of diversity distort artificial intelligence and specifically computer vision?" and Gebru pointed out that there are biases that exist in the software developers. While at Microsoft, Gebru co-authored a research paper called Gender Shades, which became the namesake of a project of a broader Massachusetts Institute of Technology project led by co-author Joy Buolamwini. The pair investigated facial recognition software; finding that Black women were 35% less likely to be recognised than White men.

2018–2020: Artificial intelligence ethics at Google 
Gebru joined Google in 2018, where she co-led a team on the ethics of artificial intelligence with Margaret Mitchell. She studied the implications of artificial intelligence, looking to improve the ability of technology to do social good.

In 2019, Gebru and other artificial intelligence researchers "signed a letter calling on Amazon to stop selling its facial-recognition technology to law enforcement agencies because it is biased against women and people of color", citing a study that was conducted by MIT researchers showing that Amazon's facial recognition system had more trouble identifying darker-skinned females than any other technology company's facial recognition software. In a New York Times interview, Gebru has further expressed that she believes facial recognition is too dangerous to be used for law enforcement and security purposes at present.

Exit from Google 
By the end of her career at Google in 2020, Gebru had determined that publishing research papers was more effective at bringing forth the ethical change she was focused on than pressing her superiors in the company. She and five others coauthored a research paper, "On the Dangers of Stochastic Parrots: Can Language Models Be Too Big?", that covered the risks of very large language models, regarding their environmental and financial costs, inscrutability leading to unknown dangerous biases, the inability of the models to understand the concepts underlying what they learn, and the potential for using them to deceive people.

In December 2020, her employment with Google ended after higher Google managers asked her to either withdraw the as-yet-unpublished paper, or remove the names of all the Google employees from that paper (that is, five of the six coauthors, leaving only Emily M. Bender). In a six-page mail sent to an internal collaboration list, Gebru describes how she was summoned to a meeting at short notice where she was asked to withdraw the paper and she requested to know the names and reasons of everyone who made that decision, along with advice for how to revise it to Google's liking. She said she would work with Google on an employment end date after an appropriate amount of time if not provided with that information. Google did not meet her request and terminated her employment immediately, declaring that they accepted her resignation. Jeff Dean, Google's head of AI research, replied with an email saying that they made the decision because the paper ignored too much relevant recent research on ways to mitigate some of the problems described in it, about environmental impact and bias of these models.

Dean went on to publish his internal email regarding Gebru's departure, and his thoughts on the matter, defending Google's research paper process to "tackle ambitious problems, but to do so responsibly". Gebru and others blame this initial publication, and Dean's subsequent silence on the matter, to have both catalyzed and enabled harassment that followed close behind his response. Gebru was serially harassed by a number of sock puppet accounts and internet trolls on Twitter, making racist and obscene comments. Gebru and her supporters alleged some of the harassment to be from machine learning researcher Pedro Domingos and businessman Michael Lissack, who had said that her work was "advocacy disguised as science". Of Domingos, Gebru said he "hide[s] behind civility and enable[s] the trolls". Lissack also allegedly harassed Mitchell and Bender, along with other colleagues on Gebru's former team. Twitter temporarily suspended Lissack's account access on 1 February 2021.

Gebru has repeatedly maintained that she was fired, and close to 2,700 Google employees and more than 4,300 academics and civil society supporters signed a letter condemning Gebru's alleged firing. Nine members of Congress sent a letter to Google asking it to clarify the circumstances around Timnit Gebru's exit. Gebru's former team demanded that Vice President Megan Kacholia be removed from the team's management chain. Kacholia had allegedly fired Gebru without notifying Gebru's direct manager Samy Bengio first, and demanded Kacholia and Dean apologize for how Gebru was treated. Mitchell took to Twitter to criticize Google's treatment of employees working to eliminate bias and toxicity in AI, including its alleged dismissal of Gebru. Mitchell was later terminated.

Following the negative publicity over the circumstances of her exit, Sundar Pichai, CEO of Alphabet, Google's parent company, publicly apologized on Twitter without clarifying whether she was terminated or resigned, and initiated a months-long investigation into the incident. Upon conclusion of the review, Dean announced Google would be changing its  "approach for handling how certain employees leave the company," but still did not clarify whether or not Gebru's leaving Google was voluntary. Additionally, Dean said there would be changes to how research papers with "sensitive" topics would be reviewed, and diversity, equity, and inclusion goals would be reported to Alphabet's board of directors quarterly. Gebru wrote on Twitter that she "expected nothing more" from Google, and pointed out that the changes were due to the requests she was allegedly terminated for, but that no one was held accountable for it. In the aftermath, two Google employees resigned from their positions at the company.

Following her departure, Google held a forum to discuss experiences with racism at the company, and employees reported to NBC News that half of it was spent discrediting Gebru, which they took as the company making an example of her for speaking out. The town hall was followed up with a group psychotherapy session for Google's Black employees with a licensed therapist, which the employees said was dismissive over the harm they felt Gebru's alleged termination had caused.

2021–present: Independent research 
In November 2021, The Nathan Cummings Foundation, partnered with Open MIC and endorsed by Color of Change, filed a shareholder proposal calling for a "racial equity audit," to analyze its "adverse impact" on "Black, Indigenous and People of Color (BIPOC) communities". The proposal also requests investigation into whether or not Google retaliated against minority employees who raised concerns of discrimination, citing Gebru's firing, her previous urge for Google to hire more BIPOC, and her research into racially-based biases in Google's technology. The proposal followed a less formal request from a group of Senate Democratic Caucus members led by Cory Booker from earlier that year, also citing Gebru's separation from the company and her work.

In December 2021, Reuters reported that Google was under investigation by California Department of Fair Employment and Housing (DFEH) for its treatment of Black women, after numerous formal complaints of discrimination and harassment by current and former workers. The probe comes after Gebru, and other BIPOC employees, reported that when they brought up their experiences with racism and sexism to Human Resources, they were advised to take medical leave and therapy through the company's Employee Assistance Program (EAP). Gebru, and others, believe that her alleged dismissal was retaliatory and evidence that Google is institutionally racist. Google said that it "continue[s] to focus on this important work and thoroughly investigate[s] any concerns, to make sure [Google] is representative and equitable".

In June 2021, Gebru announced that she was raising money to "launch an independent research institute modeled on her work on Google's Ethical AI team and her experience in Black in AI".

On 2 December 2021 she launched the Distributed Artificial Intelligence Research Institute (DAIR), which is expected to document the effect of artificial intelligence on marginalized groups, with a focus on Africa and African immigrants in the United States. One of the organization's initial projects plans to analyze satellite imagery of townships in South Africa with AI to better understand legacies of apartheid.

Awards and recognition 
Gebru, Buolamwini, and Inioluwa Deborah Raji won VentureBeats 2019 AI Innovations Award in the category AI for Good for their research highlighting the significant problem of algorithmic bias in facial recognition. Gebru was named one of the world's 50 greatest leaders by Fortune in 2021. Gebru was included in a list of ten scientists who had had important roles in scientific developments in 2021 compiled by the scientific journal Nature.

Gebru was named one of Time's most influential people of 2022.

Selected publications

See also 

 Meredith Whittaker
 Claire Stapleton
 Sophie Zhang

References

External links 

 Profile at Stanford University
 

Year of birth missing (living people)
Living people
21st-century African-American women
21st-century American businesswomen
21st-century American businesspeople
21st-century American women scientists
21st-century Ethiopian women
African-American activists
African-American businesspeople
African-American computer scientists
African-American social scientists
African-American women in business
American computer scientists
American social activists
American social justice activists
American social scientists
American women computer scientists
American women social scientists
Apple Inc. employees
Artificial intelligence ethicists
Artificial intelligence researchers
Computer scientists
Criticism of Google
Data miners
Ethiopian activists
Ethiopian emigrants to the United States
Ethiopian women activists
Ethiopian women computer scientists
Ethiopian women scientists
Google employees
Machine learning researchers
Microsoft employees
Political refugees in the United States
Stanford University alumni
Women computer scientists